The Milan and Margaret Packard House at 110 W 100 S in Springville, Utah was built in 1908.  It was listed on the National Register of Historic Places in 1998.

It was built of fired brick.

References

Houses on the National Register of Historic Places in Utah
Neoclassical architecture in Utah
Houses completed in 1908
Houses in Utah County, Utah
National Register of Historic Places in Utah County, Utah
1908 establishments in Utah
Buildings and structures in Springville, Utah
Individually listed contributing properties to historic districts on the National Register in Utah